Open o or Turned c (majuscule: Ɔ, minuscule: ɔ) is a letter of the extended Latin alphabet.  In the International Phonetic Alphabet, it represents the open-mid back rounded vowel. It is used in the orthographies of many African languages using the African reference alphabet.

The Yucatec Maya language used Ɔ as a consonant in the orthography of the Colonial period. Now dz or tz' is preferred.

Unicode

On a personal computer, ɔ can be typed by holding the ALT key and typing 596 on the number keypad. The capital Ɔ  can be typed similarly by using ALT+390.

Related characters

Descendants and related characters in the Latin alphabet
Ɔ  with diacritics: ɔ́ ɔ̀  ɔ̃ ᶗ 
Uralic Phonetic Alphabet-specific symbols related to Ɔ :

Similar looking letters

Open o looks like a reversed letter 'C'. Claudius introduced a Ɔ  (the antisigma) with the intention of replacing bs and ps.

The Scandinavian explanatory symbol (forklaringstegnet) can be typeset using the open o followed by a colon, thus: ɔ:. It is used to mean "namely", "id est", "scilicet" or similar.

This letter is often used to refer to the Copyleft official sign, which looks like an open o with a circle around it.

See also
 Open E
 Writing systems of Africa § Latin script
 Omicron

References

Oz
Oz
Vowel letters